The 2020 Munster Senior Football Championship was the 2020 installment of the annual Munster Senior Football Championship organised by the Munster GAA. The fixtures were announced on RTÉ Radio on 8 October 2019. Due to the impact of the COVID-19 pandemic on Gaelic games, all GAA activity was suspended until late in the year.

On 22 November 2020, Tipperary won the title after a 0-17 to 0-14 win against Cork in the final. It was Tipperary's first Munster title in 85 years.

To mark the centenary of Bloody Sunday, Tipperary wore special commemorative jerseys in white and green in the final, a replica of the colours worn by the Tipperary team which played Dublin in Croke Park in 1920.

Teams
The Munster championship is contested by all six counties in the Irish province of Munster.

Bracket

Quarter-finals
The four non-finalists of the 2019 championship entered this round. The lowest ranked counties to play in the quarter-finals were Limerick and Waterford of Division 4.

Summary

Matches

Semi-finals
The two finalists from the 2019 championship entered this round along with the two quarter-final winners. The lowest ranked county to play in the semi-finals was Limerick of Division 4.

Summary

Matches

Final

Tipperary advanced to the 2020 All-Ireland SFC semi-finals.

See also
 2020 All-Ireland Senior Football Championship
 2020 Connacht Senior Football Championship
 2020 Leinster Senior Football Championship
 2020 Ulster Senior Football Championship

References

External links
 https://web.archive.org/web/20121028164800/http://munstergaa.ie/

2M
Munster Championship
Munster Senior Football Championship